The Whites is an American country music vocal group from Fort Worth, Texas, United States. It consists of sisters Sharon White and Cheryl White, and their father, Buck White. Sharon on guitar, Cheryl on bass and Buck on Mandolin. Formed in 1972, the trio has recorded multiple albums and charted multiple songs on the Billboard Hot Country Songs chart. They are also known as frequent collaborators of country and bluegrass musician Ricky Skaggs, who is Sharon's husband.

Overview
The Whites consist of Sharon White (born December 17, 1953), her sister Cheryl (born January 27, 1955), and their father Buck (born December 13, 1930). It consists of sisters Sharon White and Cheryl White, and their father, Buck White. Buck grew up playing music and started playing in dances wrestling arenas, auditoriums but he didn't really like that atmosphere a lot. Buck had two jobs when the sisters were growing up; a plumber by day, piano and mandolin player by night. He started really enjoying music when his family started playing together all around the world. In the beginning, Sharon took up bass when she was twelve, moving to guitar when Cheryl took over on bass. 

In the 1980s, they scored such hits as "You Put The Blue In Me", "Hangin' Around", "Give Me Back That Old Familiar Feeling", "Pins And Needles", "If It Ain't Love (Let's Leave It Alone)", "Hometown Gossip", and "When The New Wears Off of Our Love".

In August 1981, Sharon White married Ricky Skaggs, who performed on several of the Whites' early releases. In 1987, the couple released the hit song, "Love Can't Ever Get Better Than This".

In 1991, the Whites joined producers Randall Franks and Alan Autry on the In The Heat Of The Night TV series album entitled Christmas Time's A Comin''', performing on the track, "Let's Live Everyday Like It Was Christmas" (Sonlite/MGM/UA).

The Whites became members of the Grand Ole Opry in 1984 and were current regulars on the program in Nashville, Tennessee.  Their collaborative album with Ricky Skaggs, "Salt of the Earth" won the 2008 Grammy for Best Southern/Country/Bluegrass Album.

The Whites can be heard on the O Brother, Where Art Thou? soundtrack with the song "Keep on the Sunny Side". They also appear in Down from the Mountain'', the documentary of a concert given by the soundtrack artists.

The Whites were inducted into the Texas Country Music Hall of Fame on Saturday, August 16, 2008, in Carthage, Texas.  They were inducted along with Buck Owens and Mickey Newbury.

Also performing on the Grand Ole Opry with Buck, Sharon and Cheryl is Rosanna, better known as Rosie, the third of the four White sisters. She performs high harmony and occasionally does solo performance of the Mel Tillis classic "The Violet and the Rose".

Awards and nominations
The Whites have been nominated for five CMA Awards (The Horizon/New Artist award 1983, Vocal Group of the Year 1983/1985 and Instrumental Group of the Year 1983/1985) and won the Album of the Year honour in 2001 for their contribution to "O Brother, Where Art Thou?". In 1987, Sharon White and her husband Ricky Skaggs won the Vocal Duo of the Year award.

They also received Top Vocal Group nominations in 1982 and 1983 from the ACM Awards and an album of the year nomination for "O Brother, Where Art Thou?".

In 1984, they were inducted into the Grand Ole Opry.

In 1987, Sharon White and her husband Ricky Skaggs won the Country Music Association Award for Vocal Duo of the Year.

Also for their contribution to "O Brother, Where Art Thou?", The Whites won Album of the Year at the 2001 International Bluegrass Music Awards. That same year, Sharon and Cheryl also received the Recorded Event of the Year award for their contribution to "Follow Me Back to the Fold: A Tribute to Women in Bluegrass". In 2006, they were awarded the IBMA's Distinguished Achievement Award for their contributions to the genre.

The Whites were among the artists honoured with the prestigious Grammy Award for Album of the Year for "O Brother, Where Art Thou?". Salt of the Earth, their 2007 collaboration with Ricky Skaggs won them a Grammy Award for Best Southern, Country or Bluegrass Gospel Album.

In 2007, The Whites and Ricky Skaggs received a GMA Dove Award for Bluegrass Recorded Album of the Year.

In 2008, they were inducted into the Texas Country Music Hall of Fame.

Discography

Albums

Singles

Sharon White solo singles

References

External links
The Whites - Skaggs Family Records

1972 establishments in the United States
Country music groups from Tennessee
Country music groups from Texas
Musical groups established in 1972
Grand Ole Opry members
Grammy Award winners
Vocal trios
Curb Records artists
MCA Records artists
Family musical groups